Thomas "Brandy" Semchuk (born September 22, 1971) is a Canadian former professional ice hockey player. He played in the NHL with the Los Angeles Kings during the 1992–93 NHL season. Semchuk was selected in the 2nd round (28th overall) in the 1990 NHL Entry Draft by the Los Angeles Kings.

Semchuk played two seasons (1988–1990) on the Canada men's national ice hockey team under head coach Dave King. Prior to turning professional, Semchuk played 14 games in the WHL with the Lethbridge Hurricanes.

Semchuk also played in the AHL, ECHL, IHL, CHL, and later in the WCHL and WPHL.  He was the head coach of the Fresno Monsters but is now retired.

Career statistics

Regular season and playoffs

References

External links

Los Angeles Kings: On the Spot with Brandy Semchuk

1971 births
Living people
Ice hockey people from Calgary
Los Angeles Kings draft picks
Los Angeles Kings players
Calgary Canucks players
Lethbridge Hurricanes players
Nashville Knights players
Raleigh IceCaps players
Erie Panthers players
San Antonio Iguanas players
Canadian ice hockey right wingers